Ytrehovdeholmen Island is the largest of four islands in a cluster. Mapped by Norwegian cartographers from air photos taken by the Lars Christensen Expedition, 1936–37, and named Ytrehovdeholmen (the outer knoll island) because of its position among the islands adjacent to Langhovde Hills.

See also 
List of antarctic and sub-antarctic islands

Islands of Queen Maud Land
Prince Harald Coast